Cathy Tie is a Canadian bioinformatician and entrepreneur, the founder of Ranomics, a genetic screening company, and of Locke Bio, a telemedicine company, both based in Toronto.

Background and education 
Tie's family moved from China to Canada when she was four years old. Her father has a master's degree in chemical engineering, but she describes both parents as "entrepreneurs." Growing up in Mississauga, Ontario, she attended  the Glenforest Secondary School (International Baccalaureate Diploma Program).

At 15, she worked on an immunology project with researchers at the University of Toronto, work that was published the next year in the Canadian Young Scientist Journal as a single-author manuscript. Further research using yeast as a gene variant model was published by a larger team in 2018.

During her first year as an undergraduate at the University of Toronto, Tie worked at Mount Sinai Hospital, in the genetic research laboratory of Frederick Roth. After hearing about a competition for a biotech startup, she teamed up with Leo Wan, a graduate student in Roth's lab, to create a business plan for a genomics start-up. They later presented their business plan to IndieBio, an accelerator run by SOSV, who gave them $100,000 of funding. Tie took a leave of absence in 2014 after less than a year of college to work on the project in San Francisco with IndieBio.

In 2015, Tie was one of only four Canadians to win a Thiel Fellowship, which encourages college undergraduates to leave college and instead further their education by building a startup company.

Career
Tie founded Ranomics as its CEO in 2015. In a JLabs profile, Tie explained that the company's focus was to investigate variants of unknown significance (VUS) that caused genetic tests to fail or misdiagnose patients. Ranomics worked for external genetic testing firms in a business-to-business arrangement to analyze oncogene mutations. In 2016, Ranomics published a database of 2,000 variants of the BRCA1 gene, whose mutants are tied to breast and ovarian cancer. Clinicians who detected an unknown variant could get it tested by Ranomics, in comparison with functionality data for these 2,000 variants, in order to predict if the new one is harmful or benign.

In 2018, Tie was named a partner in SF-based Cervin Ventures, an early-stage venture firm based in San Francisco.

In 2019, Tie founded Locke Bio, a telemedicine and data-mining company based in Toronto that offers online telemedicine and telepharmacy services to consumers, while building health datasets. In 2020, Tie and Locke Bio published a free online COVID-19 assessment tool that allows people to check their symptoms online by filling out an online symptom questionnaire and consulting with a doctor over video chat.

Awards
In 2015, Tie was selected as a Thiel Fellow. That same year, she and Ranomics co-founder Leo Wan won a $100K USD incubator mentorship through SOSV's incubator IndieBio. 

In 2017, the Kairos Society chose Ranomics as one of its "Kairos 50" for "improving the understanding of human genetics."

In 2018, Forbes magazine listed Tie as one of its Healthcare "30 under 30". In 2019, Forbes also included Tie among its "30 under 30" innovators in Canada.

References

Living people
Canadian women biologists
Canadian bioinformaticians
Businesspeople from Ontario
1996 births
Thiel fellows
21st-century Canadian biologists
21st-century Canadian women scientists